Johnny known professionally as Negro Johnny was an Indian actor and stunt co-ordinator in the Kannada film industry, as well as Malayalam, Telugu, Tamil film industries. His films include Samyuktha (1988), Gajapathi Garvabhanga (1989) and SP Sangliyana 2 (1990).

Career
Negro Johnny has been part of more than 300 movies in Kannada apart from many Malayalam, Telugu and Tamil films.

Selected filmography

 Bombat Hendthi (1992)
 Inspector Vikram (1989)
 Bombat Raja Bandal Rani (1995)
 Thooguve Krishnana (1994)
 Halli Meshtru (1992)
 Kaliyuga Bheema (1991)
 Sundara Kanda (1991)
 Prathap (1990)
 Inspector Vikram (1989)
 Parashuram (1989)
 Swasthik (1999)

See also

List of people from Karnataka
Cinema of Karnataka
List of Indian film actors
Cinema of India

References

External links
 Biography of Negro Johny on Chiloka.com

Kannada people
Male actors in Kannada cinema
Indian male film actors
Male actors from Karnataka
20th-century Indian male actors
21st-century Indian male actors
2007 deaths
1959 births